Sir John Maxwell, CBE (24 December 1882 – 14 February 1968) was a British police officer.

Maxwell grew up in Muirkirk, Ayrshire. He joined the Manchester City Police in 1901 and served as Chief Constable from 1927 to November 1942. He was appointed Commander of the Order of the British Empire (CBE) in the 1936 New Year Honours and knighted in the 1941 New Year Honours.

Maxwell's involvement in the 1940/1941 Greenfield case over his dismissal of a fireman resulted in considerable negative publicity.

Footnotes

See also
Charles Norman Greenfield

British Chief Constables
1882 births
1968 deaths
People from East Ayrshire
Knights Bachelor
Commanders of the Order of the British Empire